Sagi is an Israeli male given name, of Hebrew origin, meaning "great, elevated,  sublime".

People

First name
Sagi Muki (born 1992), Israeli judoka
Sagi Hartov (born 1978), Israeli-British cellist
Sagi Strauss (born 1976), retired football player

Surname
Gideon Sagi (born 1939), former member of Knesset
Teddy Sagi (born 1971), London-based Israeli billionaire businessman
Yehoshua Sagi (born 1933), former member of Knesset
Uri Sagi (born 1943), retired IDF general

Places
Sagi, Iran
Sagi, Pakistan

See also
Japanese torpedo boat Sagi, two Japanese warships
Chagi (Sagi), Indian surname
Sagittarius (disambiguation)